The Road to France is a 1918 American silent war drama film directed by Dell Henderson and starring Carlyle Blackwell, Evelyn Greeley and Jack Drumier.

Cast
 Carlyle Blackwell as Tom Whitney
 Evelyn Greeley as Helen Bemis
 Jack Drumier as 	John Bemis
 Muriel Ostriche as Mollie
 George De Carlton as 	Robert Whitney
 Jane Sterling as 	Mrs. Whitney
 Richard Neill as Hector Winter 
 Inez Shannon as 	Mrs. O'Leary
 Henry West as Burns
 Alex Shannon as Hugo Kraus 
 Joseph W. Smiley as 	Chief of Police 
 J. Gunnis Davis as	Dennis O'Leary 
 Elizabeth Kennedy as Little O'Leary Girl
 Al Hart as 	One-eyed Man

References

Bibliography
 Connelly, Robert B. The Silents: Silent Feature Films, 1910-36, Volume 40, Issue 2. December Press, 1998.
 Munden, Kenneth White. The American Film Institute Catalog of Motion Pictures Produced in the United States, Part 1. University of California Press, 1997.

External links
 

1918 films
1918 drama films
1910s English-language films
American silent feature films
Silent American drama films
American black-and-white films
Films directed by Dell Henderson
World Film Company films
American World War I films
1910s American films
English-language drama films